Mataundh is a town and a nagar panchayat in Banda district in the Indian state of Uttar Pradesh.

Geography
It has an average elevation of 142 metres (465 feet).

Demographics
 India census, Mataundh had a population of 8278. Males constitute 53% of the population and females 47%. Mataundh has an average literacy rate of 47%, lower than the national average of 59.5%: male literacy is 57%, and female literacy is 35%. In Mataundh, 17% of the population is under 6 years of age.

References

Cities and towns in Banda district, India